The Klondike-class destroyer tender was a class of ships that served the United States Navy from 1945 to 1970.

History
The Klondike-class destroyer tenders were modified United States Maritime Commission Type C3-class ships. All four ships were built at Todd Pacific Shipyards in San Pedro, Los Angeles, California. None of the ships saw service during World War II, and  directly entered the Reserve Fleet. All ships were recommissioned during the Korean War.  was redesignated as a repair ship in 1960.

Ships in class

References

1940 ships
 
 
 
Auxiliary depot ship classes